The 2019 FAI Cup (known as the Extra.ie FAI Cup for sponsorship purposes) was the 99th edition of the annual Republic of Ireland's cup competition. Forty teams participated in the competition, including all teams from the Premier Division and First Division. The competition began on 19 April 2019 with the first of five rounds and ended on 3 November 2019 with the final at the Aviva Stadium in Dublin, a nominally neutral venue, which has hosted the final since 2010.

The defending champions were Premier Division side Dundalk, after they defeated Cork City 2–1 in the previous final.

Shamrock Rovers won the final 4–2 against Dundalk for their 25th title. Because Rovers qualified for the Europa League through the Premier Division, the fourth-place team in the Premier Division, Derry City, earned qualification for 2020–21 edition of the UEFA Europa League.

Qualifying round

The draw for the qualifying round was made on 20 March 2019 at the National Sports Campus in Abbotstown. Former Republic of Ireland international Keith Fahey and FAI Vice President Noel Fitzroy performed the draw, with representatives from the clubs in attendance.

A total of 20 teams were in the qualifying round draw: 16 intermediate teams and four junior teams. Four teams received byes into the first round of the competition: Cobh Wanderers, Crumlin United, Letterkenny Rovers and Killester Donnycarney.

All ties were set to be played the week ending Sunday 21 April.

First round

The draw for the first round took place on 8 July 2019 at the Aviva Stadium in Dublin, and was hosted by Con Murphy. National under-21 team manager Stephen Kenny and former Derry City manager Gavin Dykes performed the draw.

A total of 32 teams were in the first round draw: 20 teams from the Premier Division and First Division, four teams who received byes from the qualifying round and eight winners of the qualifying round.

All ties were set to be played the week ending Sunday 11 August, except the tie between Athlone Town and Longford Town, which was postponed to 13 August due to an unplayable pitch.

Teams in bold advanced to the second round.

Second round

Teams in bold advanced to the Quarterfinals.

The draw for the second round took place on 12 August 2019 and was broadcast live on the Extra.ie Facebook page.

All ties were played on the week ending Sunday 25 August.

Quarter-finals
Teams in bold advanced to the semi-finals.

Semi-finals 

The draw for the semi-finals took place on 12 September 2019 and was broadcast live on Morning Ireland on RTÉ Radio 1. Both ties were played on the weekend ending 29 September and were shown live on RTÉ2.

Final

Top scorers

Notes

References

See also
 2019 League of Ireland Premier Division
 2019 League of Ireland First Division
 2019 League of Ireland Cup

External links

 
FAI Cup seasons
FAI Cup
1